The Ambassador Extraordinary and Plenipotentiary of the Russian Federation to the State of Israel is the official representative of the President and the Government of the Russian Federation to the Prime Minister and the Government of Israel.

The ambassador and his staff work at large in the Embassy of Russia in Tel Aviv. There is a consulate general in Haifa.

History of diplomatic relations

Diplomatic relations between the Soviet Union and Israel were formalised in May 1948, not long after the Israeli Declaration of Independence. The first envoy, was appointed on  26 June 1948, and presented his credentials on 17 August that year. Relations were further strengthened the following year with the conversion of the missions to the level of embassies.

In June 1967 the Soviet Union once more broke off relations, over the Six-Day War. For the next thirty years diplomatic relations were officially broken, until a thaw took place under the leadership of Mikhail Gorbachev. A consular mission was established in August 1987, and on 30 September 1990 this resulted in the opening of consulates, and the appointment of a consul general. On 3 January 1991 diplomatic relations were officially restored, and on 18 October 1991 the consulate general was upgraded to an embassy. Alexander Bovin was appointed as the new ambassador, and presented his credentials on 23 December 1991. With the official dissolution of the Soviet Union two days later, Bovin remained in post as representative of the Russian Federation, serving until 1997.

List of representatives (1948 - present)

Representatives of the Soviet Union to Israel (1948 – 1991)

Representatives of the Russian Federation to Israel (1991 – present)

References

External links
Russian consulate in Israel

Ambassadors of the Soviet Union to Israel
Israel
Russia